Huai River Water Resources Commission (HRWC) is a government agency of Ministry of Water Resources of the People's Republic of China. HRWC takes responsibility of water administration of the Huai River basin which covers some parts of Henan, Anhui, Jiangsu, Shandong and Hubei provinces. The head office is in Bengbu City.

External links
 The official website of Huai River Water Resources Commission (in Chinese Language)

Water resource management in China
Huai River